A job creation index is a measure of net hiring of full- and part-time adult workers. In the US, the index score is derived by subtracting the percentage of American workers who say their employers are 'firing' from the percentage of workers who say their employers are 'hiring'.

United States
The job creation index has been increasing since falling to -5 in February 2009 during the Great Recession.

According to Gallup, in 2013 North Dakota was ranked number 1 for job creation in the US and had the highest job creation index with a score of 40, thus surpassing its closest competitors District of Columbia and South Dakota's score by 10 points. North Dakota has held this spot since 2009. Rhode Island earned a spot at the bottom of the job creation index with a score of 12. In 2013, the average score in the U.S. was 20, up 2 points from 2012. Nearly all states have shown significant improvement in job creation. The survey showed that northern states in the midwest are seeing a growth in jobs much more so than in other parts of the US. The results are based on telephone interviews from Gallup, which took place from January 2, 2013 - December 29, 2013. Gallup surveyed 208,758 adults employed full or part-time in all 50 states.

In July 2017, the job creation index returned to its all-time high of +37. This was one point higher than the index score in June.

Politics
Three of the top five job creation index scores of 2013 are heavily Republican while a significant number of the states with the bottom index scores (six out of the bottom seven) are heavily Democratic. However, Gallup assessed, “Apart from this, there is little correspondence between net hiring and partisan affiliation in the states."

United States 2013 scores

See also
 

 Bureau of Labor Statistics
 Conference Board Leading Economic Index
 Economic mobility
 Economy of the United States
 List of U.S. states and territories by unemployment rate
 Occupational Outlook Handbook
 Unemployment in the United States

References

External links
 Gallup's weekly Job Creation Index
 Gallup's daily Job Creation Index

Surveys (human research)
Labour economics indices
Polling terms
Polling
United States statistical areas
Employment in the United States